Spafford Valley is a hamlet in Onondaga County, New York, United States, in the Otisco Valley south of Otisco Lake. The hamlet is noted for "The Bucktail," a picturesque gorge with waterfalls.

References

Hamlets in New York (state)
Syracuse metropolitan area
Hamlets in Onondaga County, New York